The Piper PA-44 Seminole is an American twin-engined light aircraft manufactured by Piper Aircraft.

The PA-44 is a development of the Piper Cherokee single-engined aircraft and is primarily used for multi-engined flight training.

The Seminole was built in 1979–1982, in 1989–1990, and has been in production since 1995.

Design and development
The first production Seminoles are equipped with two 180 hp (135 kW) Lycoming O-360-E1A6D engines. The right-hand engine is a Lycoming LO-360-E1A6D variant, which turns in the opposite direction to the left-hand engine. This feature eliminates the critical engine and makes the aircraft more controllable in the event that an engine needs to be shut down or fails.

The first prototype Seminole made its maiden flight in May 1976 and the type was publicly announced on February 21, 1978. The Seminole was first certified on March 10, 1978, and introduced as a 1979 model year in late 1978. Gross weight is 3800 lbs (1723 kg).

Later production Seminoles were built with Lycoming O-360-A1H6 engines.

The PA-44-180T Turbo Seminole version was certified on November 29, 1979. It features two turbocharged 180 hp (135 kW) Lycoming TO-360-E1A6D engines, which offer a significant improvement in performance at high density altitude. The Turbo Seminole had its takeoff gross weight raised to 3925 lb (1780 kg), while the landing weight remained at 3800 lbs (1723 kg).

The PA-44 features a high T-tail similar to the T-tailed Arrow IV. The Seminole is visually similar to the Beechcraft Duchess.

Production of both versions of the Seminole was stopped in 1982, after 361 Seminoles and 87 Turbo Seminoles had been built. Production of the normally aspirated PA-44-180 restarted in 1988. Changes were limited to modifications to the aircraft's electrical systems and instrumentation. Production was stopped again in 1990 after 29 more aircraft had been delivered owing to Piper's financial problems. Production restarted again in 1995.

Variants

Normally aspirated version powered by two Lycoming O-360-E1A6D or two O-360-A1H6 engines.
PA-44-180T Turbo Seminole
Turbocharged version powered by two Lycoming TO-360-E1A6D engines.
PA-44 Seminole DX
A proposed diesel-powered variant powered by two Continental Motors CD-170 engines.

Operators

Civil
The PA-44 is popular with air charter companies and flight schools, and is operated by private individuals and companies.

Military

 Royal Jordanian Air Force

 Peruvian Air Force

Specifications (PA-44-180 Seminole)

See also

References

External links

 Piper Aircraft PA-44 Home page

Seminole
1970s United States civil trainer aircraft
Low-wing aircraft
T-tail aircraft
Aircraft first flown in 1978
Twin piston-engined tractor aircraft